Tripura was recognized as a state in India on January 21, 1972. Before that, Tripura was a Union Territory. The first Legislative Assembly Election as a state was held on March 11, 1972. The 1972 Tripura Legislative Assembly election took place in a single phase to elect the Members of the Legislative Assembly (MLA) from each of the 60 Assembly Constituencies (ACs) in Tripura, India.

Indian National Congress led by Sukhamoy Sen Gupta, won 41 seats and formed a Government in Tripura.

Highlights
Election to the Tripura Legislative Assembly were held on March 11, 1972. The election were held in a single phase for all the 60 assembly constituencies.

Participating political parties

No. of constituencies

Electors

Performance of women candidates

Result

Constituency winners

Government formation
Indian National Congress (INC) won 41 out of 60 seats in the Legislative Assembly. The CPI-M won 18 seats in the Legislative Assembly. Sukhamoy Sen Gupta of the INC formed a government as Chief Minister on March 20, 1972.

Prafulla Kumar Das formed a government as Chief Minister on April 1, 1977.

Radhika Ranjan Gupta formed a coalition government with the Janata Party (JP) and the Left Front (LF) on July 26, 1977. Chief Minister Radhika Ranjan Gupta resigned, and the state of Tripura was placed under presidential rule from November 5, 1977 to January 5, 1978.

References

State Assembly elections in Tripura
Tripura